An adjunct professor is a type of academic appointment in higher education who does not work at the establishment full-time. The terms of this appointment and the job security of the tenure vary in different parts of the world, but the term is generally agreed to mean a bona-fide part-time faculty member in an adjunct position at an institution of higher education.

Terminology
An adjunct professor may also be called an adjunct lecturer, an adjunct instructor, or adjunct faculty. Collectively, they may be referred to as contingent academic labor. The rank of sessional lecturer in Canadian universities is similar to the US concept.

North America 

In the United States, an adjunct is, in most cases, a non-tenure-track faculty member. However, it can also be a scholar or teacher whose primary employer is not the school or department with which they have adjunct status. 
Adjunct professors make up the majority of instructors in higher education (post-secondary) institutions. As with other part-time workers, they are paid less than full-time professors and do not receive employee benefits such as health insurance or an office.
In most cases, adjunct professors need a master's degree, but in some cases only require a bachelor's degree and relevant experience. However, over a third have a doctoral degree. In many universities, the title "adjunct professor" (or variations thereof, such as "adjunct associate professor") implies a PhD or other terminal degree; those with a master's or bachelor's degree may receive the title of "adjunct lecturer". In 2018 the American Association of University Professors (AAUP) expressed concern that only a quarter of university positions are tenure-track, with implications for job security and academic freedom. The AAUP analysis determined that 73% of university teaching positions in the United States are non-tenure track.

In Canada, adjunct professors are often nominated in recognition of active involvement with the appointing institution. At the same time, they are employed by the government, industry, a profession, or another institution. The term course lecturer, rather than adjunct, is used if the appointment is strictly to teach one or more courses. In contrast, the US uses this title for all instructors.

Europe 
In Portugal, the designation professor adjunto implies stable full-time employment in a polytechnic university. Notably, in countries such as Argentina and Brazil, a similar designation, professor adjunto, also implies stable employment. The same term used in Argentina and Brazil refers to a non-tenured position in parts of Spain.

In Hungary, there exists a similar term adjunktus, as well as adiunkt in Poland.

In Finland, the Docents' Union of Finland and the Finnish Ministry of Education recommend the term adjunct professor or associate professor in English as a translation of the title of docent. A docentship should be regarded as an educational title not connected with the employment rank as such, rather an assurance of the level of expertise, to enable the person to advance further in their academic career. The rank of a docent entitles scientists to be principal investigators, lead research groups, and act as the supervisors of doctoral students.

Some universities in The Netherlands have adjunct professors, where the title applies to the highest ranking variant of associate professor, thus having quite a distinct interpretation from the American use of the term.

South Asia 
In Bangladesh, private universities follow the title adjunct professor or adjunct associate professor to imply non-tenure faculty members.

In Pakistan, adjunct (assistant/associate) professors are also considered as non-regular faculty members, and usually, posts are given to Pakistani overseas scientists under a faculty development program.

Southeast Asia and Oceania 
In Australia, the term adjunct is reserved for academics and researchers from outside the university who have a close association with the university, e.g., through supervision of PhD students, recognized by an honorary title reflective of their rank and standing (adjunct lecturer, senior lecturer, associate professor or professor).

In Thailand, adjunct (assistant/associate) professors are considered "non-regular officers".

References 

Broad-concept articles
 
Academic ranks